Newcastle Reform Synagogue, also known by its Hebrew name Ner Tamid ("Everlasting Light"), is a member of the Movement for Reform Judaism. It is located in Gosforth in Newcastle-upon-Tyne.

The community was founded in 1963 by children of European-Jewish refugees. After about 20 families had showed interest the previous year in forming a Reform congregation, assistance was sought from the nearest Reform synagogue, Sinai Synagogue, Leeds, who lent a Torah scroll and some prayer books. Services were held in homes, school rooms and church halls.

In 1963 the newly formed congregation bought a Methodist chapel in Derby Street, off Barrack Road, in Newcastle. This was converted into a synagogue, function hall, school rooms and a caretaker's flat, and the congregation grew. However, eleven years later, the congregation was served with a Compulsory Purchase Order and had to abandon the building. For the next ten years the community held regular services as before, in homes, school halls and church halls. On High Holy Days it used the Newcastle City Council Chambers.

The present purpose-built synagogue was completed in 1982.  A dedicated cemetery in North Shields has a prayer house, complete with facilities for tahara (ritual cleansing of the deceased).

See also
 List of synagogues in the United Kingdom
 List of former synagogues in the United Kingdom
 List of Jewish communities in the United Kingdom
 Movement for Reform Judaism

References

External links 
 Official website
 JCR-UK entry on Newcastle Reform Synagogue, including photographs
 Jewish Small Communities: Newcastle Reform Synagogue

1963 establishments in England
Buildings and structures in Newcastle upon Tyne
Reform synagogues in the United Kingdom
Synagogues completed in 1982